KK Crvena zvezda in the ABA League shows records and statistics of Serbian men's professional basketball club Crvena zvezda in the ABA League competition system. The ABA League, commonly known as the Adriatic League, is a regional men's professional basketball league competition between men's teams from six countries: Bosnia and Herzegovina, Croatia, Montenegro, North Macedonia, Serbia and Slovenia. Crvena zvezda made the league debut in 2002, in the second season. The club won six League Championships and one Super Cup tournament.

Overview 
Note: Statistics are correct through the end of the 2021–22 season.

Competitions

League

Standings

Positions by year

Super Cup

Individual awards

League

Super Cup

All-time ideal five 
In April 2020, the ABA League fans selected the Crvena zvezda all-time ideal team based on players who played for the club in the league.

References

ABA
Crvena Zvezda